Level 42 is the debut album released 1 August 1981 by the British group Level 42.

It is best known for the track "Love Games", which became a successful jazz–funk and dancefloor hit for the band (reaching number 38 on the UK single chart). It has figured in both L42's and bassist Mark King's solo live appearances to this day. Also gaining substantial dance airplay on both sides of the Atlantic Ocean was the track "Starchild", with Lindup on vocals.

The second single, "Turn it On", released in the United Kingdom, Spain, France and Canada, peaked at #47 in the UK single charts.

The third single, "Starchild", has been released in six countries beyond the United Kingdom (peak position: #57), including the United States of America, where it entered the Club Play Singles at #60. In 2001, it was re-released by the label Peppermint Jam Records in the United Kingdom and Germany.

Track listing
Original Vinyl LP (Polydor 2383 612)
"Turn It On" (Badarou, Gould, Gould, King) – 4:42
"43" (King) – 7:04
"Why Are You Leaving?" (Gould, Lindup) – 4:36
"Almost There" (Gould, Gould, King) – 5:45
"Heathrow" (Badarou) – 4:43
"Love Games" (Gould, King) – 5:20
"Dune Tune" (King) – 4:52
"Starchild" (Badarou, Gould, King) – 5:58

First CD Pressing (Polydor 821 935-2)
(On the first CD pressing, the album versions of "Turn It On", "Love Games" and "Starchild" were replaced with the extended versions. Later pressings and reissues contain the original album versions.)
"Turn It On" (Badarou, Gould, Gould, King) – 5:36
"43" (King) – 7:02
"Why Are You Leaving?" (Gould, Lindup) – 4:34
"Almost There" (Gould, Gould, King) – 5:42
"Heathrow" (Badarou) – 4:43
"Love Games" (Gould, King) – 7:25
"Dune Tune" (King) – 4:50
"Starchild" (Badarou, Gould, King) – 6:41

2000 reissue bonus tracks
Forty-Two (Gould, Gould, King, Lindup) – 6:39
Beezer One (Badarou, King, Gould, Lindup, Gould) – 7:09
Foundation & Empire (King) – 8:27
Dune Tune (live) (King) – 5:03
Goodbye Ray Schmidt-Volk – 2:07

2007 reissue bonus tracks
Heathrow (Live, Regal Theatre, Hitchin 1983)
Turn It On (Live, Regal Theatre, Hitchin 1983)
Starchild (Long Version)
Love Games (Live, Ryde Theatre, Isle Of Wight 2000)
Why Are You Leaving? (Live Ryde Theatre, Isle Of Wight 2000)

Personnel 

Level 42
 Mark King – bass, percussion, vocals (lead vocals on 'Turn It On', "Why Are You Leaving", "Almost There" & "Love Games")
 Mike Lindup – Minimoog, acoustic piano, electric piano, percussion, vocals (lead vocals on "Starchild", chorus lead vocals on "Turn it On" & "Almost There", bridge lead vocals on "Love Games")
 Boon Gould – guitars
 Phil Gould – drums, percussion, glockenspiel, timbales, backing vocals
with:
 Wally Badarou – Prophet-5, Korg Polyphonic, Minimoog, vocalizing (courtesy Barclay Records)
 Leroy Williams – congas, bongos, percussion
 Gary Barnacle – electric saxophone solo on "Heathrow"
 Dave Chambers – tenor saxophone solo on "Why Are You Leaving"

2007 Re-issue:
 Lyndon Connah – keyboards & vocals (Tracks 4 & 5)
 Nathan King – guitars & vocals (Tracks 4 & 5)
 Gary Husband – drums (Tracks 4 & 5)
 Sean Freeman – saxophone & vocals (Tracks 4 & 5)

Production 
 Mike Vernon – producer 
 Dick Plant – engineer 
 Gregg Jackman – assistant engineer 
 Richard Lengyel – assistant engineer
 John Rule – assistant engineer
 Tom Coyne – mastering 
 Joe Bartling – illustration

2007 Re-issue:
 Gary Moore – remastering
 Charles Brockbank – design 
 Paul Fernandez – illustration 
 Paul Sexton – liner notes

Charts

Album charts

Single charts

Sales and certifications

References

Level 42 albums
1981 debut albums
Albums produced by Mike Vernon (record producer)
Polydor Records albums
Albums recorded at RAK Studios